The 2020 FAI Women's Cup is the 45th edition of the Republic of Ireland's primary national cup competition for women's association football teams. This edition features clubs exclusively from the Women's National League (WNL), whereas usually non-league teams are involved. The number of teams was reduced due to the Coronavirus pandemic. The restrictions also meant that crowds were restricted or prohibited from attending. The competition began on 19 September 2020 with a preliminary round and concluded on 12 December 2020. The final was moved to the Tallaght Stadium from the Aviva Stadium in Dublin, which had hosted the previous seven finals.

The WNL Cup was deferred for the season, but the 2020 FAI Women's Cup was effectively a League Cup, with the nine Women's National League clubs the only participants. Peamount United won the cup on 12 December, beating Cork City in the final.

The Cup holders were Wexford Youths, who defeated Peamount United in both the 2018 and 2019 finals.

Preliminary round

The draw for the quarter final took place on 29 July 2020. Women's National League (WNL) expansion teams Athlone Town and Bohemians were selected to play in a single match preliminary round, the winner of which was to join the other seven WNL clubs in the quarter finals.

Teams in bold advanced to the quarter final.

Quarter-finals 

Teams in bold advanced to the semi-finals.

Semi-finals 

The draw for the semi-finals took place on 9 October 2020 live on RTÉ 2fm.

Final

References 

2020 FAI Women's Cup
FAI Women's Cup seasons
2020 in Irish sport
2020 in Republic of Ireland association football cups

External links
FAI Women's Senior Cup at Football Association of Ireland